Sunoh (Hindi: सुनो, translation: Listen) is the first album of the Indian singer Lucky Ali released in 1996. This Album made him very popular and he won many awards for it including the Best Pop Male Vocalist in the 1996 Screen Awards and the Channel V Viewers Choice Award (1997). It stayed on the MTV Asia Charts for 60 weeks. All lyrics were written by Lucky's childhood friend Syed Aslam Noor. According to Lucky, many record labels rejected the album as the genre was not popularised in India that time, then Lucky went to Amitabh Bachchan Corporation (ABCL), where the songs were unused for about 6 months. Then Lucky asked them back and then went to BMG Crescendo which agreed to release the album but asked Lucky to make the music video by himself, which led him to his childhood friend and ad film director Mahesh Mathai, who directed the iconic video of "O Sanam" in Cairo, Egypt.

The Song 'O Sanam' went on to become a popular track, becoming one of the most successful Indian pop songs .

Track listing
O Sanam  
Sunoh 
Pyaar ka Musafir 
Aap Par Arz
Milegi Milegi Manzil
Tum Hi Se
Yeh Zameen Hai. Aasman hai
Jab hum chhote hote the
Kya Mausam Hai
Yeh Mumbai Nagariya

Credits 
Arranged by, Engineer: Mikey McCleary (credited as Michael McCleary)

Design (Cover Design): Pooja Mehta, Sonal Dabral

Lyrics: Syed Aslam Noor, Arif Dehlvi (Additional)

Music by: Lucky Ali

Costumes: Iqbal & Imtiza

Performed by: Lucky Ali and Mikey McCleary

Cover Photography: Suresh Natarajan

Producer: Lucky Ali

See also 
  Lucky Ali discography

References

1996 albums
Lucky Ali albums